Jennifer Cossitt (née Birchall; born 22 June 1948) was a Progressive Conservative party member of the House of Commons of Canada. She was a business executive by career. 

Her husband was Thomas Cossitt, member of Parliament for the Leeds—Grenville electoral district. Cossitt served as her husband's executive assistant for nine years. Following his death in 1982, she campaigned at the riding in a 12 October 1982 by-election and won the seat. Cossitt took a fifth-ballot victory at a nominating convention of Leeds-Grenville Conservative Riding Association in the town of Prescott, Ontario, gaining 262 votes. On her first day in the House of Commons (27 October 1982), she spoke against Liberal employment policies and entered an unsuccessful motion to debate these.

Jennifer Cossitt won re-election in the 1984 federal election, but was defeated in the following 1988 federal election by Jim Jordan of the Liberal party. She served for the latter part of the 32nd Canadian Parliament and a full term in the 33rd Parliament.

Election results

See also
Politics of Canada

References

External links
 

1948 births
Living people
British expatriates in Canada
Members of the House of Commons of Canada from Ontario
People from Brockville
People from Redcar
Progressive Conservative Party of Canada MPs
Women members of the House of Commons of Canada
Women in Ontario politics